House Creek is a  stream in the mountains of western Sonoma County, California which empties into the Wheatfield Fork Gualala River.

Course
The creek originates on Welbridge Ridge and descends initially to the west. Cedar Creek enters from the southeast, then Britain Creek from the north. It then flows generally northward. After Soda Spring Creek enters from the east, the creek crosses under Stewarts Point Skaggs Springs Road and empties into the Wheatfield Fork.

Habitat and pollution
As of 2000, House Creek and most of its major tributaries supported steelhead trout. However, by 2002 the trout were so threatened that the National Oceanic and Atmospheric Administration took action against Hedgpeth Ranch operator James Soper for killing 34 juvenile fish by driving a tractor through the creek.

Bridges
Sonoma County bid out the seismic retrofitting of this structure in 2002.

See also
 List of watercourses in the San Francisco Bay Area

References

Rivers of Sonoma County, California
Rivers of Northern California